Rhaphipteroides apicalis is a species of beetle in the family Cerambycidae, and the only species in the genus Rhaphipteroides. It was described by Touroult and Tavakilian in 2007.

References

Pteropliini
Beetles described in 2007